Moteh or Mothey is a village in Suryapet district of the Indian state of Telangana. It is located in Mothey mandal of Suryapet division.

Geography
It has an average elevation of 237 metres (780 ft).

References

Mandal headquarters in Suryapet district
Villages in Suryapet district